Search incident to a lawful arrest, commonly known as search incident to arrest (SITA) or the Chimel rule (from Chimel v. California), is a U.S. legal principle that allows police to perform a warrantless search of an arrested person, and the area within the arrestee’s immediate control, in the interest of officer safety, the prevention of escape, and the preservation of evidence.

In most cases, a search warrant pursuant to the Fourth Amendment is required to perform a lawful search; an exception to this requirement is SITA.

Related case law

1940s
In Harris v. United States (1947), the United States Supreme Court held that a law enforcement officer was permitted to perform a warrantless search during or immediately after a lawful arrest of the arrestee and their premises, regardless of what the arrest was for.

1950s
In United States v. Rabinowitz (1950), the court narrowed its ruling to searches of the area within the arrestee's "immediate control."

1960s
In Chimel v. California (1969), the Court further limited the exception to the person arrested and the area within their immediate control "in order to remove any weapons that the [arrestee] might seek to use in order to resist arrest or effect his escape" and to prevent the "concealment or destruction" of evidence.

1970s
United States v. Robinson (1973) – The U.S. Supreme Court held that "in the case of a lawful custodial arrest a full search of the person is not only an exception to the warrant requirement of the Fourth Amendment, but is also a reasonable search under that Amendment."

1990s
Maryland v. Buie (1990) – The U.S. Supreme Court held that the Fourth Amendment permits a properly limited protective sweep in conjunction with an in-home arrest when the searching officer possesses a reasonable belief based on specific and articulable facts that the area to be swept harbors an individual posing a danger to those on the arrest scene.

2000s
Arizona v. Gant (2009) – The U.S. Supreme Court ruled that law enforcement officers can search automobiles following arrest only if the person arrested "could have accessed his car at the time of the search."  In other words, if the person arrested could conceivably reach into his car for a weapon, then a search based on officer safety is permitted.  Otherwise, the old practice of allowing officers to "search [a car] incident to arrest" is no longer allowed, unless the police have reason to believe the vehicle contains evidence of the offense of arrest.

2010s
 Missouri v. McNeely (2013) The United States Supreme Court ruled that police must generally obtain a warrant before subjecting a drunken-driving suspect to a blood test, and that the natural metabolism of blood alcohol does not establish a per se exigency that would justify a blood draw without consent.
Riley v. California (2014) – The U.S. Supreme Court held that "police generally may not, without a warrant, search digital information on a cell phone seized from an individual who has been arrested." In other words, unless an exigent circumstance is present, police may not search an arrestee's cell phone without a warrant.
Birchfield v. North Dakota (2016) - The U.S. Supreme Court held that for driving under the influence investigations warrantless breathalyzer tests are permissible under the fourth amendment given that impact on privacy is "slight" while more intrusive blood tests involving piercing the skin are not.  In the opinion of the court, the court states that "there must be a limit to the consequences to which motorists may be deemed to have consented by virtue of a decision to drive on public roads" under implied consent laws and "that motorists could be deemed to have consented to only those conditions that are 'reasonable' in that they have a 'nexus' to the privilege of driving".

See also
Information privacy law

References

Further reading

 
 

Searches and seizures